The Beloit Sky Carp are a Minor League Baseball team of the Midwest League and the High-A affiliate of the Miami Marlins. They are located in Beloit, Wisconsin, and play their home games at ABC Supply Stadium. They previously played at Harry C. Pohlman Field from its opening in 1982 until moving into their current ballpark in August 2021. 

Originally known as the Beloit Brewers from 1982 to 1994 and the Beloit Snappers from 1995 to 2021, the team played in the Class A Midwest League from 1982 to 2020. In conjunction with Major League Baseball's reorganization of Minor League Baseball in 2021, Beloit was shifted to the High-A Central, though this was renamed the Midwest League in 2022. The team rebranded as the Sky Carp prior to the 2022 season.

History

The Beloit Brewers joined the Midwest League as an expansion franchise in 1982. The club was a Milwaukee Brewers farm team from its inception through 2004. Beloit switched to the Minnesota Twins' farm system for the 2005 season. The organization adopted the Snappers nickname in 1995 after using its parent team's nickname for its first 13 seasons. The Snappers' name derived from the snapping turtle, because Beloit was formerly known as Turtle Village, and there is still a Turtle Creek and a town of Turtle. All of these are named for a turtle-shaped Indian mound on the campus of Beloit College.

After the Brewers and Snappers ended their affiliation, efforts were started to build a new stadium similar to the facilities used by the Rockford RiverHawks or the Wisconsin Timber Rattlers. One possible scenario involved construction on a site near Janesville, which could have included renaming the team to reflect a broader Rock County audience. However, no new stadium was built and improvements, including redoing the entire field and repairing the concrete concourse, were made to the existing site. After the 2012 season, the city of Beloit appropriated $100,000 in order to completely redo the outfield. The outfield was raised and leveled with the infield and a new sprinkler system was installed.

In September 2018, the team entered into the process of being sold to a new group of investors who planned to build a new ballpark in downtown Beloit. The sale was cancelled in May 2020 amid uncertainty surrounding the Professional Baseball Agreement between Minor and Major League Baseball set to expire after the 2020 season. The group, led by Quint Studer, retained the right to operate the Snappers in 2020 and continued to move forward with plans to build a new stadium. On June 15, 2020, construction began on the new ABC Supply Stadium. The Snappers started the 2021 season at Pohlman Field, and played their first game at ABC Supply Stadium on August 3.

Prior to the 2021 season, the Snappers were organized into the High-A Central. Plans to rebrand the team for the 2021 season, with a new name selected through a "name the team contest" and a new mascot, were postponed until 2022. In November 2021, the team rebranded as the Beloit Sky Carp, taking their new moniker from a nickname for geese. In 2022, the High-A Central became known as the Midwest League, the name historically used by the regional circuit prior to the 2021 reorganization.

Former players
The 2003 team included two sons of former major league players. Prince Fielder, the son of former American League home run champion Cecil Fielder and Tony Gwynn Jr., son of Tony Gwynn. Future major leaguer Danny Valencia played for the 2007 team. Another noted major leaguer, Jim Morris of The Rookie fame played for the Beloit Brewers when he came out of college in the 1980s. Other former Snappers players who moved on to major league ball include Greg Vaughn, Geoff Jenkins, Jeff D'Amico, Ron Belliard, and Yovani Gallardo. Minnesota Twins players that have come through include Matt Garza and Kevin Slowey.

Roster

Season-by-season record

Notable alumni
Baseball Hall of Fame alumni

 Paul Molitor (1990)  Inducted, 2004

Non-HOF and current players

 Skye Bolt 
 Matt Chapman (2014) MLB All-Star, 3x MLB Gold Glove Award
 Matt Olson (2013)
 Ryan Dull (2013)
 Miguel Sano (2012) MLB All-Star
 Brian Dozier (2010) MLB All-Star
 Eddie Rosario (2012) 2021 NLCS MVP
 J. J. Hardy (2010) 2 x MLB All-Star
 Aaron Hicks (2010)
 Ben Revere (2008) 
 Yangervis Solarte (2008)
 Wilson Ramos (2007) 2014 Tony Conigliaro Award
 Danny Valencia (2007)
 Brian Duensing (2006)
 Matt Garza (2005) 
 Evan Meek (2005) MLB All-Star
 Trevor Plouffe (2005)
 Carlos Silva (2005)
 Kevin Slowey (2005)
 Chris Capuano (2004) MLB All-Star
 Yovani Gallardo (2004) MLB All-Star
 Carlos Villanueva (2004)
 Tony Gwynn Jr. (2003)
 Manny Parra (2003)
 Rickie Weeks (2003) MLB All-Star
 Tom Wilhelmsen (2003)
 Mike Adams (2002) 
 Prince Fielder (2002–03) 6 x MLB All-Star; 2007 NL Home Run Leader; 2009 NL RBI Leader
 Geoff Jenkins (2001) MLB All-Star
 Mark Leiter (2001)
 Bill Hall (2000)
 Don Money (2000–04, MGR) 4 x MLB All-Star
 Fernando Vina (1999)  MLB All-Star
 Chad Fox (1998) 
 Mike Matheny (1998) 
 José Valentín (1997)
 Ronnie Belliard (1995) MLB All-Star
 Jeff D'Amico (1995, 1997)
 Kevin Seitzer (1994) 2 x MLB All-Star; 
 Cory Lidle (1996) Died: Age 34
 Greg Vaughn (1994) 4 x MLB All-Star
 Mike Boddicker (1993)  MLB All-Star
 Jeff Cirillo (1992) MLB All-Star
 Teddy Higuera (1992) MLB All-Star
 Darren Holmes (1991) 
 Ed Nunez (1991)
 Jim Gantner (1990)
 Bill Krueger (1990) 
 Greg Brock
 Cal Eldred (1989)
 Paul Mirabella (1989) 
 Dale Sveum (1989) 
 Pat Listach (1988) 1992 AL Rookie of the Year
 Dave Nilsson (1988, 1998) MLB All-Star
 Steve Sparks (1988)
 John Jaha (1987, 1995, 1998) MLB All-Star
 Bill Spiers (1987, 1992)
 Greg Vaughn (1987) 
 Narciso Elvira (1987)
 Doug Henry (1986)
 Randy Veres (1986)
 B.J. Surhoff (1985) MLB All-Star
 Tom Candiotti (1984) MLB All-Star
 Jim Morris (1984–85) subject: The Rookie
 Jeff Parrett (1984)
 Chris Bosio (1983–84, 1990) MLB All-Star
 Chuck Crim (1983, 1990) 
 Juan Nieves (1983)
 Bill Wegman (1982, 1990)

References

External links
 
 Statistics from Baseball-Reference

Baseball teams established in 1982
Midwest League teams
Beloit, Wisconsin
Professional baseball teams in Wisconsin
Miami Marlins minor league affiliates
Minnesota Twins minor league affiliates
Milwaukee Brewers minor league affiliates
Oakland Athletics minor league affiliates
1982 establishments in Wisconsin
High-A Central teams